Skellefteå FF is a football club in Skellefteå, Västerbotten, Sweden. The club was founded in 1921, and was then called Skellefteå AIK Fotboll, a name it kept until 2006. In the 2015 season, the club plays in the Division 2 Norrland league.

Background
The name Skellefteå AIK Football was changed to Skellefteå Förenade Fotbollsföreningar in January 2006. The background is a project that was initiated in 2005 to establish a football team as high up the Swedish football league system as possible. The Sunnanå SK, Morön BK and Skellefteå AIK clubs are included in the project.

Skelleftea FF's A-team has brought together the best players from the various member clubs. In 2009 the club played in the Division 1 Norra for the first time but unfortunately finished bottom of the table and were relegated back to Division 2 Norrland.

The club is affiliated to the Västerbottens Fotbollförbund.

Season to season

Footnotes

External links
 ]

Football clubs in Västerbotten County
Sport in Skellefteå
Association football clubs established in 1921
1921 establishments in Sweden